Hangman's Elm, or simply "The Hanging Tree", is an English Elm located at the northwest corner in Washington Square Park in Greenwich Village, Manhattan, New York City.

In 1989, the New York City Department of Parks and Recreation determined that this English Elm was 310 years old, although that was subsequently revised to "more than 300 years old". As a result, it is considered to be Manhattan's oldest, outliving Peter Stuyvesant’s pear tree at the northeast corner of 13th Street and Third Avenue, and the great Tulip poplar at Shorakapkok in Manhattan's Inwood neighborhood.

The earliest references to the elm as a "hanging tree" date from the late 19th century, long after the supposed hangings were said to have taken place and many come from the accounts of the Marquis de Lafayette.  Recent extensive research into the park's history by more than one historian has shown that the tree was on a private farm until the land was bought by the city and added to Washington Square in 1827. No public records exist of hangings from this tree.

The only recorded execution in this area was of Rose Butler, in 1820, for arson.

See also 
List of hanging trees
List of individual trees
Dule tree
Gibbeting

References

External links
Washington Square Park Phase 1A Archaeological Survey

Individual elm trees
Greenwich Village
Individual trees in New York City